Frederick John Randon (18 November 1873 – 15 January 1949) was an English cricketer. Randon was a left-handed batsman who bowled left-arm medium pace. He was born at Hathern, Leicestershire.

Randon made his debut for Leicestershire in their inaugural first-class match against Essex in 1894 at the County Ground, Essex. He made two further first-class appearances in 1894 against Surrey and Lancashire. In his three matches, he took 4 wickets at an average of 32.00, with best figures of 3/20. With the bat, he scored 5 runs at a batting average of 1.66.

He died at the village of his birth on 15 January 1949. His father Frederick Randon senior also played first-class cricket.

References

External links
Frederick Randon at ESPNcricinfo
Frederick Randon at CricketArchive

1873 births
1949 deaths
People from the Borough of Charnwood
Cricketers from Leicestershire
English cricketers
Leicestershire cricketers